Li County or Lixian is an administrative division of the prefecture-level city of Longnan in southeastern Gansu, a northwestern province of China. The 2010 Chinese census found a population of 458,237, a decline of around 25,000 from the year 2000 but still placing it second in size within its prefecture.

The county seat is also known as Lixian, formerly romanized as Li Hsien. It is located at the confluence of the Western Han and Yanzi rivers, tributaries of the Jialing and Yangtze watersheds. Commanding a valley connecting the Yellow and Yangtze river systems, it was an important outpost of the Shang and Zhou dynasties and was the initial seat of the Ying family who later established the kingdom and empire of Qin.

Geography
Lixian is bordered within Longnan by the counties of Xihe to the east, Wudu to the south, and Tanchang to the west. The municipalities of Dingxi and Tianshui lie to the northwest and northeast, respectively.

Sir Eric Teichman, the British diplomat and orientalist, described the territory in 1916 before its modern development: ...the path [from Tianshui] crosses the Tsin-ling Shan, and passes from the basin of the Huang Ho into that of the Yang-tse by an easy pass. The south-eastern corner of Kan-su, south of the Tsin-ling Shan range, differs greatly from the rest of the province. The bare loess hills of Central Kan-su with their waterless valleys give way to jungle-covered mountains with abundance of water, and coolie transport takes the place of camels, carts, and mules. The people are in close touch with Sechuan.

The Liba gold deposit lies within the county limits.

Climate

Agriculture
Huaniu apples are a speciality agricultural product of the region.

History
Scientists from Lanzhou University have established that widespread agriculture began in Li County around 6,400 years ago as part of the Banpo phase of the Yangshao culture of the Wei River valley. The warm, humid climate of the mid-Holocene made the area productive for millet prior to the drier conditions which began about 2000 BC.

By the time of ancient China, Lixian was part of the territory of Xichui (lit. "the Western March"). During the Shang dynasty, Zhongjue and his son Feilian  controlled Xichui from the midst of the area's Rong tribes. Feilian's son Elai served King Zhou as his bodyguard and was killed when King Wu overthrew him and founded the Zhou dynasty.

Under the Zhou, however, Elai's familythe House of Yingcontinued to control the area. His great-great-grandson was Daluo  who had two sons by different mothers in the early 9th century BC. Cheng, his son by the daughter of the Marquis of Shen, inherited Xichui and the other son, Feizi, initially went without and served as his brother's horse breeder. His reputation grew to the point that King Xiao charged him with breeding and providing the imperial cavalry. He proved so successful that, when the Marquis of Shen blocked his inheritance of Daluo's estate, King Xiao created him lord of nearby Qin (present-day Zhangjiachuan, Gansu). During the 842 BC Compatriots Rebellion, the Zhou king Li was overthrown at Hao and forced into a prolonged exile; the Rong took the occasion to attack and massacre Cheng's clan at Xichui. King Xuan named Feizi's great-grandson Qin Zhong commander over the Zhou expeditions against the Rong around 827 BC but the Rong killed him at Qin in 822. His son Zhuang and his four younger brothers successfully invaded the Rong lands with 7,000 Zhou soldiers and recovered both Qin and Xichui.

At some point during Spring and Autumn period, barley and wheat were introduced into the area in addition to its traditional millet. Created a duke over Xichui, Zhuang moved his family's capital to the site, establishing the city of Quanqiu. When Zhuang died in 778 BC, his eldest son Shifu refused to inherit official duties but chose instead to live a life on his chariot, fighting the Rong in revenge for his grandfather's death. His younger brother Xiang opted to marry his sister Mu Ying to King Feng of the Rong and, the next year in 776 BC, he moved his capital from Quanqiu to Qian (present-day Longxian in Shaanxi). Shifu led the defense of Quanqiu against the Rong who subsequently invaded. Overcome, he was captured and lived among the Rong for a year before being released. When the Quanrong overcame Hao in 771 and ended the Western period of the Zhou, Xiang was granted a promotion by King Ping and no longer suffered subordinate status.

Under the Qin and Han dynasties, it was part of Longxi Commandery, headquartered at Didao (present-day Taoyang in Lintao County). During the Northern Wei dynasty, it was part of Hanyang Commandery, headquartered at Hanyang (present-day Tianshui). Under the Western Wei, this was changed to Hanyang County. During the Tang, Lixian was known as Changdao and was part of Qinzhou, a province centered variously at Shanggui (present-day Tianshui) and Chengji (present-day Qin'an). The area was the home of the noted 10th-century memoirist Wang Renhui. Li County was separated from Tianshui's jurisdiction during the ninth year of Chenghua (AD 1473) during the Ming dynasty.

Li County's loess is prone to erosion and landslides. Amid the increasing collectivization of agriculture from 1964 to 1978, just seven flows damaged  of farmland, destroyed 17,544 homes, and killed 1,142 people.

During the Cultural Revolution, the area received a bit of local notoriety for its flagging grain production. The "experiences of Li County" were used by regional officials to caution against implementation of Tachai-style collectivism in the mid-1970s. The collective farms in the area saw decreasing year-on-year yields of grain until, by 1976, all 29 of the county's communes were consuming more grain than they produced. This provoked official action, which denounced the complaints as "sabotage" and "poison", in the period between the fall of the Gang of Four and the rise of Deng Xiaoping's economic reforms.

The area is also subject to earthquakes, with 25 recorded as having a magnitude of 5.0 or higher. The largest recorded was an 8.0-magnitude quake that struck on July 21, 1654; most recently, a 6.6-magnitude quake struck on July 22, 2013.

Administrative divisions
Present-day, Li County includes 22 towns and 6 townships :
Towns

-Towns are upgraded from Township.

-Towns are established newly.

-Former Towns are merged to other.

Townships

-Former Townships are merged to other.

See also
 Dabaozishan Site and Graves

External links
 Official website

References

County-level divisions of Gansu
Longnan